Allopachria is a genus of beetles in the family Dytiscidae, containing the following species:

 Allopachria abnormipenis Wewalka, 2000
 Allopachria balkei Wewalka, 2000
 Allopachria beeri Wewalka, 2000
 Allopachria bimaculata (Satô, 1972)
 Allopachria dieterleorum Wewalka, 2000
 Allopachria dudgeoni Wewalka, 2000
 Allopachria ernsti Wewalka, 2000
 Allopachria flavomaculata (Kamiya, 1838)
 Allopachria friedrichi Wewalka, 2000
 Allopachria froehlichi Wewalka, 2000
 Allopachria guidettii Wewalka, 2000
 Allopachria hautmannorum Wewalka, 2000
 Allopachria hendrichi Wewalka, 2000
 Allopachria holmeni Wewalka, 2000
 Allopachria jaechi Wewalka, 2000
 Allopachria jendeki Wewalka, 2000
 Allopachria jilanzhui Wewalka, 2000
 Allopachria kodadai Wewalka, 2000
 Allopachria liselotteae Wewalka, 2000
 Allopachria quadrimaculata (Satô, 1981)
 Allopachria quadripustulata Zimmermann, 1924
 Allopachria sausai Wewalka, 2000
 Allopachria schillhammeri Wewalka, 2000
 Allopachria schoenmanni Wewalka, 2000
 Allopachria scholzorum Wewalka, 2000
 Allopachria schramhauserorum Wewalka, 2000
 Allopachria shepardi Wewalka, 2000
 Allopachria taiwana (Satô, 1990)
 Allopachria umbrosa Zimmermann, 1927
 Allopachria vietnamica (Satô, 1995)
 Allopachria wangi Wewalka & Nilsson, 1994
 Allopachria weinbergerorum Wewalka, 2000
 Allopachria zetteli Wewalka, 2000

References

Dytiscidae